Splendrillia flavopunctata is a species of sea snail, a marine gastropod mollusk in the family Drilliidae.

Description
The length of the shell varies between 11 mm and 19 mm.

Distribution
This marine species occurs off the Netherlands Antilles and Barbados.

References

 Fallon P.J. (2016). Taxonomic review of tropical western Atlantic shallow water Drilliidae (Mollusca: Gastropoda: Conoidea) including descriptions of 100 new species. Zootaxa. 4090(1): 1–363

External links
 

flavopunctata
Gastropods described in 2016